Maharashtra College Of Engineering Nilanga (or MCEN) is an Indian engineering college located in Nilanga, Latur.

Courses 
The college offers the following courses to students: Civil Engineering, Electrical Engineering, Electronics Engineering, Mechanical Engineering with an intake of 60 students for each course.

Campus 
The college consists of a laboratory complex, workshops, administrative buildings, classroom complex, playrooms, male and female hostels and an eating house.

References

External links 
 

Engineering colleges in Maharashtra
Engineering colleges in Latur
Education in Latur
Educational institutions established in 1983
1983 establishments in Maharashtra